"Cajun Baby" is a country song that was originally recorded by Hank Williams, Jr. in 1969. He created the song by composing music to go with lyrics that had been written by his father, the late Hank Williams. The song appeared on the 1969 album Songs My Father Left Me. The single rose to #3.

Discography

1969 songs
Hank Williams Jr. songs
Songs written by Hank Williams
Songs written by Hank Williams Jr.